Jumeirah Emirates Hotel Tower, also known as Emirates Tower Two, is a 56-floor hotel in the city of Dubai, United Arab Emirates. The hotel includes 40 luxury suites and is operated by Jumeirah Group. Connected with the Emirates Office Tower by a retail boulevard, the two towers form the Emirates Towers complex. It ranks as the 48th-tallest building in the world. It is the world's third-tallest all-hotel building. Construction, by BESIX subsidiary Six Construct, was completed on 15 April 2000.

It is the place of death of the Indian actress Sridevi.

See also
 List of tallest buildings in Dubai
 List of tallest buildings in the United Arab Emirates

References 

Hotels in Dubai
Skyscraper hotels in Dubai
Hotel buildings completed in 2000